Magnolia punduana is a species of plant in the family Magnoliaceae. It is endemic to the Meghalaya subtropical forests in India.

References

punduana
Flora of Assam (region)
Taxonomy articles created by Polbot